Mbarara University of Science & Technology (MUST), commonly known as Mbarara University, is a public university in Uganda. Mbarara University commenced student intake and instruction in 1989. It is one of the ten public universities and degree-awarding institutions in the country. MUST is accredited by the Uganda National Council for Higher Education.

Location
The university has two campuses:

Once construction is completed, it will house all university faculties and institutes except the College of Health Sciences, which will remain at the Mbarara Campus. The Uganda government has spent USh5 billion (approx. US$2 million) of its own money on the construction. It has also secured a US$12 million loan from the African Development Bank to move the construction along.

History
The university was founded in 1989 to address the shortage of scientists in Uganda and to instill a sense of community service in its students.

Faculties and institutes
, MUST has six faculties and two institutes:

 Faculty of Medicine
 Faculty of Science
 Faculty of Applied Sciences and Technology
 Faculty of Computing and Informatics
 Faculty of Business and Management Sciences
 Faculty of Interdisciplinary Studies
 Institute of Tropical Forest Conservation
 Maternal Newborn and Child Health Institute

Courses
The courses offered at the university include:

Undergraduate courses

 Bachelor of Medicine and Bachelor of Surgery
 Bachelor of Science in Nursing
 Bachelor of Science in Physiotherapy
 Bachelor of Science with Education
 Bachelor of Science
 Bachelor of Pharmacy
 Bachelor of Medical Laboratory Science
 Bachelor of Computer Science
 Bachelor of Information Technology
 Bachelor of Business Administration
 Bachelor of Science in Pharmaceutical Sciences
 Bachelor of Science in Petroleum Engineering and Environmental Management
 Bachelor of Science in Electronics and Electrical Engineering
 Bachelor of Science in Biomedical Engineering

Masters courses
 Masters in Development Studies
 Master of Arts in Local Governance & Planning
 Master of Science in Biochemistry
 Master of Science in Mathematics
 Master of Science in Biology
 Master of Science in Anesthesiology
 Master of Medicine in General Surgery 
 Master of Medicine in ENT
 Master of Medicine in Internal Medicine
 Master of Medicine in Paediatrics & Child Health
 Master of Medicine in Dermatology
 Master of Medicine in Ophthalmology
 Master of Medicine in Obstetrics & Gynaecology
 Master of Medicine in Pathology & Forensic Medicine
 Master of Medicine in Community Practice & Family Medicine
 Master of Public Health
 Master of Nursing Science
 Master of Science in Clinical Psychology
 Master of Education in Planning & Management
 Master of Education in Psychology
 Master of Education in Curriculum & Media Studies

Doctorate courses

 Doctor of Philosophy in Development Studies
 Doctor of Philosophy in Education
 Doctor of Philosophy in Physics
 Doctor of Philosophy in Mathematics 
 Doctor of Philosophy in Chemistry
 Doctor of Philosophy in Biology
 Doctor of Philosophy in Computing

Students and staff
As of January 2011, the student body numbered 3,163; 3001 undergraduates and 62 postgraduates. The university employs over 200 staff members.

MUST at glance by January 2023; 6043 undergraduates, 1325 postgraduates and 19969 alumni.

Governance
Mbarara University of Science and Technology is administered by three bodies; the University Council, the University Senate and the University Top Management.

University Council
The University Council is the supreme organ of the university responsible for the overall administration and ensuring that the establishment objectives and functions of the university are duly implemented. The council members are drawn from stakeholders including university staff, students, and members from the Ministry of Education, other government departments, University Convocation, the Private Sector and the general public.

University Senate
The University Senate is responsible for overall administration, of all academic programs. The current Senate is instituted in accordance with the provisions of the Universities and other Tertiary Institutions Act of 2001, as enacted by the Parliament of Uganda.

Top management
The top management consists of the vice chancellor, deputy vice chancellor, university secretary, academic registrar, dean of students, and the executive director of Mbarara Hospital.

University teaching hospital
The university teaching hospital is Mbarara Regional Referral Hospital, a 600-bed public hospital that also serves as the referral hospital for the districts of: Mbarara, Bushenyi, Ntungamo, Kiruhura, Ibanda, Mitooma, Sheema, Buhweju, Isingiro and Rubirizi.

See also
 Education in Uganda
 List of universities in Uganda
 List of university leaders in Uganda
 Mbarara
 List of medical schools in Uganda
 Francis Mwijukye

References

External links
  Mbarara University Website
 Mbarara University of Science and Technology As At March 2013

 
Mbarara District
Public universities
Educational institutions established in 1989
Medical schools in Uganda
1989 establishments in Uganda
Engineering universities and colleges in Uganda